The Fairies is an Australian live-action children's television series created by Jenifer Watts and is based on two fairies: Harmony and Rainbow Rhapsody (known in the TV series as just Rhapsody). They also have friends, including Elf the Fairy Cake Maker, Barnaby the Bizzy Buzzy Bee and Wizzy the Wizard. Each episode of the third TV series would contain songs and dance routines. Originally it was a direct-to-video film series released by PolyGram Filmed Entertainment Australia in 1998 (The Fairies and A Fairy Merry Christmas), Carlton Home Entertainment UK in 1999 and 2000, and ABC Video in 2000, before becoming a TV series in 2005. ABC for Kids released the vintage double DVD The Fairies & The Fairies Farmyard Magic in 2004 and the TV series on DVD in 2005–09 (along with Christmas Ballet: Stage Show released in 2011), with merchandise releasing in Australia and America throughout the program's run and tours.

History
The history of the show started in 1996 with Harmony, Rhapsody, Barnaby, Elf and four tots. The producers of the series made three direct-to-video releases: two in 1998 (The Fairies/Fairy Hello! and A Fairy Merry Christmas) and one in 2000 (Farmyard Magic, along with re-releases of the first two videos from ABC). The creator of the show, Jenifer Watts, was inspired by her daughter, Abigail Kate 'Abbie' (born 1994)'s obsession with glitter and fairies. The producers replaced the 1998 portrayers of Harmony and Elf (Watts, herself, and Stuart Boag). These two characters were replaced by Lindy Allen and Rhys Bobridge. The little tots were also reduced to three. These changes were done to boost the popularity of the show as a multi-million dollar 26 part television series that was in production. In November 2005, The Fairies came to television for the first time, airing on the Seven Network in Australia, going into a 9am time slot. The Fairies was made more realistic and magical, making it more like a fantasy drama for children. New Zealand-based WETA Workshop (the outfit behind the special effects used in King Kong and The Lord of the Rings) designed the sets. Also, the actors were replaced, except for Elf. Harmony, who was the Golden Fairy, and Rhapsody, the Rainbow, were also changed into more 'girly' colours, pink and purple. Elf and Barnaby's costumes' were also changed. Elf looked more 'Elfy' and Barnaby lost two of his legs. The tots costumes and actors were also revamped, making them more cheeky, and dressing them to look more sophisticated. Wizzy, the Wizard, also debuted in the first TV series (along with his actual debut on the album A Magical Fairy Party (released in 2001)). The first TV series of the show The Fairies repeated in April 2006 on the Seven Network, going back into the 9am time slot. In 2007, The Fairies' second TV series was produced, and aired on the Seven Network from 23 April. The series added two new characters, Bubbles the Beach Fairy and Twinkle the Tooth Fairy. Sales of the DVDs in Australia have topped 100,000 units.

Characters

Main characters
 Harmony: Jenifer Watts (The Fairies/Fairy Hello! and A Fairy Merry Christmas) and Lindy Allen (Farmyard Magic) as the Golden Fairy, then Candice Moll (TV series) and Tiffany Welden-Iley (Christmas Ballet: Stage Show and Carols in the Domain 2011) as the Purple Fairy
 Rhapsody: Joni Combe (daughter of Australian children's singer-songwriter Peter Combe) (The Fairies/Fairy Hello!, A Fairy Merry Christmas, Farmyard Magic and A Magical Fairy Party album) as Rainbow Rhapsody, then Ruth Natalie Fallon (TV series) and Lulu Freedman (Christmas Ballet: Stage Show and Carols in the Domain 2011) as just Rhapsody the Pink Fairy
 Barnaby the Bizzy Buzzy Bee: Wally Carr (The Fairies/Fairy Hello!, A Fairy Merry Christmas and Farmyard Magic), and then PJ Oaten (A Magical Fairy Party album, TV series, Christmas Ballet: Stage Show and Carols in the Domain 2011)
 Elf the Fairy Cake Maker: Stuart Boag (The Fairies/Fairy Hello! and A Fairy Merry Christmas), then Rhys Bobridge (Farmyard Magic, A Magical Fairy Party album, 2005, 2007) and Paul Maybury (Christmas Ballet: Stage Show and Carols in the Domain 2011)
 Wizzy the Wizard: Adam Goodburn (A Magical Fairy Party album, TV series)
 Fairy Princess Minuet the Dancing Fairy: Peppa Blackburn (2009, Christmas Ballet: Stage Show and Carols in the Domain 2011)

Other Adult characters
 Tilly the Tooth Fairy: Selina Vistoli (The Fairies/Fairy Hello!)
 Santa Claus: John Skidmore (A Fairy Merry Christmas)
 Phoebe the Farmyard Fairy: Susan Kirk (Farmyard Magic)
 Hattie and Sam's parents: Sue McCoy and Duncan Young (Farmyard Magic)
 Bubbles the Beach Fairy: Alice Darling (2007)
 Twinkle the Tooth Fairy: Melody Lian (2007)
 Cordeline the Clever Pixie: Monique Anderson (2009)
 Rainbow the Birthday Fairy: Zoe Komazec (2009)
 Jethro the Jitterboy: Tom Greenfield (2009)

Child characters
Fairy & Elf Tots: April Hancock, Lewis Rankin, Cameron Sherman, Harlan Spaven, Samantha Stokes and Abigail 'Abbie' Watts (The Fairies/Fairy Hello!, A Fairy Merry Christmas and Farmyard Magic)
Molly the Gumtree Tot: Alana Grimaldi (Farmyard Magic)
Hugo the Gumtree Tot: Michael Hayes (Farmyard Magic)
Melody the Fairyland Tot: Stephanie Antonopoulos (2005)
Jingles the Fairyland Tot: Erin Dunn (2005)
Treble the Fairyland Tot: Sam Trenwith (2005)
 Lilly-Belle the Baby Fairyland Tot: Georgia Riley (2005)
Buttercup the Fairyland Tot: Tayla Dantu-Hann (2007)
Acorn the Fairyland Tot: Matthew Wilson (2007)
 Arabella the Top of the Garden Child: Benita Grimaldi (The Fairies/Fairy Hello!, A Fairy Merry Christmas and Farmyard Magic), and then Sasha Champion (2005) 
 William the Top of the Garden Child: James Mercuri (The Fairies/Fairy Hello!, A Fairy Merry Christmas and Farmyard Magic), and then Harrison Dearing (2005)
 Emily the Top of the Garden Child: Joanna Reppucci (The Fairies/Fairy Hello!, A Fairy Merry Christmas and Farmyard Magic)
 Hattie the Farm Child/Twin: Emily Rocco (Farmyard Magic)
 Sam the Farm Child/Twin: Benjamin Schapel (Farmyard Magic)
 Baby Harmony: Lucinda 'Lucy' Watts (2005)
 Baby Rhapsody: Jemma Highet (2005)
 Emma the Top of the Garden Child: Abigail 'Abbie' Watts (2005, 2007)
 Jack the Top of the Garden Child: Harrison 'Harry' Watts (2007)
 Lily the Top of the Garden Child: Elisabeth Wellings (2007)
 Fairy Dancing Girls: Momo Hoshino and Lucinda 'Lucy' Watts (2009)

Videography

Home video releases 
 The Fairies (1998)
 A Fairy Merry Christmas (1998)
 Farmyard Magic (2000)
 Fairy Magic (2005)
 Fairy Dancing (2005)
 Fairy Beach (2007)
 Fairy Fun, Fun, Fun (2007)
 Fairy Dancing Girl (2007)
 Nursery Rhymes (2009)
 Christmas Carols in Fairyland (2009)
 Christmas Ballet: Stage Show (2011)

Episode Compilations 
 The Fairy Ring (2005)
 The Fairyland Band (2005)
 Fairyland Songs: Volume 1 (2005)
 The Top of the Garden: 5 episodes from Series 2 (2007)
 Barnaby Takes The Lead: 5 episodes from the TV Series (2007)
 Wizzy's Wonky Magic (2007)
 Fairyland Songs: Volume 2 (2007)
 Fun To Learn: With Harmony, Rhapsody and their Fairyland friends! (2009)
 Fairytales (2009)
 Learn to Dance: With Fairy Princess Minuet and The Fairies (2009)
 Sing and Dance: Hit Songs from 2009 (2009)
 The Best of The Fairies: Volume 1 (2010)

Discography
The Fairies (2000)
A Fairy Merry Christmas (2000)
Farmyard Magic (2000)
A Magical Fairy Party (2001)
Fairy Magic (2005)
Fairy Dancing (2005)
Fairy Beach (2007)
Fairy Fun, Fun, Fun (2007)
Best Party Songs (2007)
Nursery Rhymes (2009)
Princess Perfect (2009)
Lullabies (2009)
Christmas Carols in Fairyland (2009)
Favourites (2010)
Christmas Ballet: Stage Show (2011)

iTunes releases

Albums 
 Fairy Magic (2016)
 Fairy Dancing (2016)
 Lullabies (2016)
 Fairy Fun, Fun, Fun! (2016)
 Fairy Beach (2016)
 Fairy Besties (2016)
 Princess Perfect (2016)
 Party Songs (2016)
 Nursery Rhymes (2016)
 Fairy Merry Christmas (2016)
 Vintage Fairies (2017)
 Vintage Farmyard (2017)

Movies 
 Fairy Hello! (1998)
 Fairy Merry Christmas (1998)
 Fairy Magic (2005)
 Fairy Dancing (2005)
 Fairy Beach (2007)
 Nursery Rhymes (2009)
 Christmas Carols (2009)

Awards and nominations

ARIA Music Awards

Helpmann Awards

See also
 South Australian Film Corporation
 Fairy (disambiguation)
 Peter Combe

References

External links
 Vintage website
 
 

Seven Network original programming
Australian children's television series
2005 Australian television series debuts
2009 Australian television series endings
Australian preschool education television series
Television shows set in Adelaide
English-language television shows
Australian Broadcasting Corporation original programming
Direct-to-video film series
Films shot in Adelaide
Musical television series
PolyGram Filmed Entertainment films
Australian children's fantasy television series
Children's film series
Fantasy film series
Australian film series
Fantasy television films
Television films as pilots
Direct-to-video fantasy films
Australian fantasy films
Nickelodeon (Australia and New Zealand) original programming
Television duos
Television about fairies and sprites
Films about fairies and sprites
1990s Australian television series
Australian children's musical groups
Musical groups established in 1996
1996 establishments in Australia